Crosslake is a city in Crow Wing County, Minnesota, United States. The population was 2,141 at the 2010 census. It is part of the Brainerd Micropolitan Statistical Area.

Geography
Main routes include County Roads 3, 16, 36, 66, and 103.

Crosslake is part of the Brainerd Lakes Area, consisting of nearly 460 lakes within a 25-mile radius of Brainerd.

Climate

History
The area of what is now Crosslake, Minnesota gained traction near the late 1800s, after the construction of the Pine River Dam in 1885.
The Logging Industry in upper Minnesota at the time was flourishing, attracting many of the first early residents of Crosslake.

Originally, the area was part of Watertown Township of Cass County. This township was annexed to Crow Wing County in 1887. It was finally accepted as by the Crow Wing County board in 1903. In 1951, the south half of this township became Crosslake Village with the remainder becoming North Crosslake Village in 1964.  They became Crosslake Village in 1972 and the City of Crosslake in 1974.

Demographics

2010 census
As of the census of 2010, there were 2,141 people, 1,027 households, and 651 families living in the city. The racial makeup of the city was 98.5% White, 0.3% African American, 0.3% Native American, 0.1% Asian, 0.1% from other races, and 0.7% from two or more races. Hispanic or Latino of any race were 0.2% of the population.

There were 1,027 households, of which 17.1% had children under the age of 18 living with them, 56.9% were married couples living together, 3.6% had a female householder with no husband present, 2.9% had a male householder with no wife present, and 36.6% were non-families. 31.9% of all households were made up of individuals, and 16.6% had someone living alone who was 65 years of age or older. The average household size was 2.08 and the average family size was 2.59.

The median age in the city was 56.1 years. 16.1% of residents were under the age of 18; 3.3% were between the ages of 18 and 24; 15.7% were from 25 to 44; 30.9% were from 45 to 64; and 34% were 65 years of age or older. The gender makeup of the city was 49.9% male and 50.1% female.

2000 census
As of the census of 2000, there were 1,893 people, 899 households, and 623 families living in the city. The racial makeup of the city was 99.52% White, 0.05% African American, 0.05% Native American, 0.05% Asian, 0.05% from other races, and 0.26% from two or more races. Hispanic or Latino of any race were 0.69% of the population. 29.6% were of German, 19.8% Norwegian, 15.9% Swedish, 5.8% English and 5.0% American ancestry according to Census 2000.

There were 899 households, out of which 15.9% had children under the age of 18 living with them, 64.0% were married couples living together, 3.3% had a female householder with no husband present, and 30.6% were non-families. 27.8% of all households were made up of individuals, and 12.3% had someone living alone who was 65 years of age or older.  The average household size was 2.11 and the average family size was 2.52.

In the city, the population was spread out, with 14.7% under the age of 18, 3.1% from 18 to 24, 18.9% from 25 to 44, 32.0% from 45 to 64, and 31.4% who were 65 years of age or older.  The median age was 56 years. For every 100 females, there were 102.0 males.  For every 100 females age 18 and over, there were 100.9 males.

The median income for a household in the city was $41,125, and the median income for a family was $45,990. Males had a median income of $40,345 versus $23,636 for females. The per capita income for the city was $27,227.  About 2.7% of families and 4.5% of the population were below the poverty line, including 7.5% of those under age 18 and 4.8% of those age 65 or over.

Education
Most of Crosslake is in Pequot Lakes Public Schools. Portions are in the Crosby-Ironton Public School District and the Pine River-Backus Public School District.
 Pequot Lakes High School is the Pequot Lakes district's high school.

Crosslake also has a K-12th Institution, Crosslake Community Schools.

References

Crosslake History

External links

City of Crosslake, MN – Official Website

Cities in Minnesota
Cities in Crow Wing County, Minnesota
Brainerd, Minnesota micropolitan area
1959 establishments in Minnesota